The Acer beTouch E140 is a smartphone manufactured by Acer Inc. utilizing the Android 2.2 (Froyo) operating system.

Main specifications

Operating System: Android 2.2
Display: 2.8-inch touch screen
Processor: 600 MHz
Wi-Fi 802.11 b / g,
 Bluetooth 2.1, IR
FM-radio
Camera: 3.2MP
Battery: 1300 mAH
Weight: 115 grams

Release
The Acer beTouch 140 was unveiled in December 2010.
The device is to be released in the UK  though the exact date is not known.
Price has not been announced but it should be around €199

See also
 Galaxy Nexus
 List of Android devices

References

beTouch E140
Android (operating system) devices
Mobile phones introduced in 2010